General George Augustus Herbert, 11th Earl of Pembroke and 8th Earl of Montgomery  (10 September 1759 – 26 October 1827) was an English peer, army officer, and politician.

Early life
He was born Lord Herbert at the family home, Wilton House in Wilton. He was the only son of Henry Herbert, 10th Earl of Pembroke and 7th Earl of Montgomery and his wife, Elizabeth, the second daughter of Charles Spencer, 3rd Duke of Marlborough. He had a younger sister Charlotte, who died at the age of 10. He was educated at home and then Harrow School from 1770 to 1775. Through his grandmother Mary FitzWilliam, daughter of the 5th Viscount FitzWilliam, he inherited the substantial FitzWilliam estates in Dublin.

Career
After leaving Harrow, Herbert was appointed an ensign in the 12th Regiment of Foot in 1775 and travelled the continent over the next five years, visiting France, Austria, Eastern Europe, Russia and Italy with Rev. William Coxe and Capt. John Floyd.

Herbert was promoted to a lieutenant in 1777 and became a captain in the 75th Regiment of Foot in 1778, before transferring to 1st The Royal Dragoons later that year. In 1781, he transferred to the 22nd Light Dragoons and the following year was promoted to a lieutenant-colonel in the 2nd Dragoon Guards.

At the start of the French Revolutionary Wars, Herbert saw action in Flanders, where he commanded the 2nd and 3rd Dragoon Guards and liaised with Prussian and Austrian forces. He was also active in the Siege of Valenciennes (1793) and captured an enemy post at Hundssluyt, near Dunkirk, later that year.

Political career
At the general election of 1780, Herbert became Member of Parliament for the family borough of Wilton and sided with the Whig opposition. He held the seat until 1784 when he was appointed Vice-Chamberlain of the Household and sworn of the Privy Council. He held the seat for Wilton again from 1788 to 1794, the year he inherited his father's titles and estate and also succeeded him as Lord Lieutenant of Wiltshire.

Later life
In 1795, Pembroke was promoted to a major-general and became colonel of the 6th (Inniskilling) Dragoons in 1797. He was further promoted to lieutenant-general in 1802 and appointed a Knight of the Garter in 1805. After serving as a plenipotentiary on a special mission to Austria in 1807, he was also appointed Governor of Guernsey and finally promoted to a general in 1812.

Personal life
Herbert married twice, firstly on 8 April 1787, to Elizabeth Beauclerk (d. 1793), his first cousin, the daughter of Topham Beauclerk by his wife, Diana. Their children included:

 George Herbert (1788–1793), eldest son and heir apparent who predeceased his father aged 5
 Lady Diana Herbert (1790–1841), who married Welbore Agar, 2nd Earl of Normanton
 Robert Herbert, 12th Earl of Pembroke (19 September 1791 – 25 April 1862), previously styled Viscount Herbert, who married Ottavia Spinelli di Laurino, Princess of Butera, and died without legitimate issue; by his mistress Alexina Sophia Gallot he had an illegitimate daughter
 Hon. Charles Herbert (1793–1798)

His second marriage was on 25 January 1808 to Countess Catherine Semyonovna Vorontsova, a daughter of the prominent Russian aristocrat and diplomat Semyon Romanovich Vorontsov. The children of the second marriage included:

 Lady Elizabeth Herbert (1809–1858), who married Richard Meade, 3rd Earl of Clanwilliam and had issue
 Sidney Herbert, 1st Baron Herbert of Lea (16 September 1810 – 2 August 1861), who by his wife Elizabeth had issue
 Lady Mary Herbert (1813–1892) who married George Brudenell-Bruce, 2nd Marquess of Ailesbury, died without issue
 Lady Catherine Herbert (31 October 1814 – 12 February 1886) who married Alexander Murray, 6th Earl of Dunmore and had issue
 Lady Georgiana Herbert (1817–1841) who married (as his first wife) Henry Petty-Fitzmaurice, 4th Marquess of Lansdowne but had no issue
 Lady Emma Herbert (1819–1884) who married Thomas Vesey, 3rd Viscount de Vesci and had issue

Lord Pembroke died on 26 October 1827 at his London home, Pembroke House, and was buried at Wilton on 12 November. After having previously quarrelled with his eldest surviving son, Robert, over the latter's marriage to the widowed Italian princess Octavia Spinelli de Rubari, Pembroke left the bulk of his unentailed and personal estate to his only son by his second wife, Sidney (later created Baron Herbert of Lea).

Notes

References

Cokayne et al., The Complete Peerage

1759 births
1827 deaths
1st The Royal Dragoons officers
2nd Dragoon Guards (Queen's Bays) officers
British Army generals
British Army personnel of the French Revolutionary Wars
British MPs 1780–1784
British MPs 1784–1790
British MPs 1790–1796
11
George
George Herbert, 11th Earl of Pembroke
Knights of the Garter
Lord-Lieutenants of Wiltshire
Herbert, George Herbert, Lord
Members of the Privy Council of Great Britain
People educated at Harrow School
People from Wilton, Wiltshire
Suffolk Regiment officers
Gordon Highlanders officers
6th (Inniskilling) Dragoons officers
Military personnel from Wiltshire